Calabozo Airport  is an airport serving Calabozo, a town in Guárico state in Venezuela.

The Calabozo non-directional beacon (Ident: CZO) is located on the field.

See also
Transport in Venezuela
List of airports in Venezuela

References

External links
OurAirports - Calabozo
OpenStreetMap - Calabozo
SkyVector - Calabozo Airport

Airports in Venezuela
Buildings and structures in Guárico
Calabozo